Project Copernicus was the codename for a cancelled massively multiplayer online role-playing game (MMORPG) that was in development at 38 Studios until 2012. The project was created by studio founder Curt Schilling, with writer R. A. Salvatore and artist Todd McFarlane being deeply involved in its development. Other notable staff included creative director Steve Danuser, art director Thom Ang, and co-composer Aubrey Hodges.

The game was set in Amalur, a fantasy universe shared with action role-playing game Kingdoms of Amalur: Reckoning (2012). The storyline would have seen the world's races, gifted with immortality through a device dubbed the Well of Souls, banding together to defeat a great evil. Developer comments compared the gameplay to World of Warcraft, and participation would have been based on a free-to-play model with cosmetic-based microtransactions.

The project was first mentioned in 2006 when the studio was founded, initially planned for a 2011 release. The game was teased with artwork and a short trailer released in May 2012, but production ceased that same year following the bankruptcy of 38 Studios. Reactions to its cancellation were varied from its staff, associated parties, and journalists covering the incident. Several noted its ambition and place within the changing gaming market of the time. In 2018, the assets of Project Copernicus were acquired by THQ Nordic along with the Amalur intellectual property.

Overview
Project Copernicus was the codename for a massively multiplayer online role-playing game (MMORPG) set in the fantasy world of Amalur, a land inhabited by multiple races and trapped in a cycle of death and rebirth; one staff member later described Amalur as a version of Earth following a magical apocalypse. Players would have an influence over the story, with different servers potentially having different versions of the world after a key narrative choice.

Players would have inhabited a member of one of four playable races − humans, elves, gnomes and ogres − and explored open environments accepting quests and fighting enemies. The aim was for a large environment that players could explore in its entirety, including large-scale landmarks. The gameplay was internally compared to World of Warcraft, with a focus on exploration, real-time combat using multiple abilities, and character classes and traits.

Project Copernicus was being planned to use a free-to-play model, which was a growing industry trend at the time. While the base game would have been free, microtransactions would have been incorporated offering optional perks and items to players such as new cosmetic armor sets, house furnishings, and in-game pets. Chat functions were also planned, with a concept of using different text fonts to distinguish the player races.

Production

Project Copernicus was created as the principal game of 38 Studios, which was founded by Curt Schilling in 2006 as Green Monster Games. Schilling, a former baseball player and avid gamer, aimed to create an MMORPG based on a new intellectual property (IP). For this, he partnered with writer R. A. Salvatore and artist Todd McFarlane to create the Amalur universe, which would provide the basis for the studio's first project. Copernicus was intended to be a market rival to World of Warcraft, aiming for a "deeper" narrative and distinct art style, and being the basis for a multimedia franchise based on its world and lore. The game was initially scheduled for release in 2011, with 38 Studios projecting annual profits of over $100 million from  its revenue.

Schilling wanted to gather high profile game developers for Project Copernicus, with it later being compared to gathering a "super star" group. Creative director Steve Danuser previously served as a designer and community manager for EverQuest II. The lead designer was Travis McGeathy, who had served in that role on the original EverQuest. The credited art director at 38 Studios was Thom Ang; while the user interface (UI) was being designed by Irena Pereira, known for her work on World of Warcraft and its expansions The Burning Crusade and Wrath of the Lich King. A team of three composers−Aubrey Hodges, Duncan Watt and Gene Rozenberg−were working on the music and sound design. Hodges was known for his work on the King's Quest series, Watt had previously been the lead composer of League of Legends, and Rozenberg had composed for a variety of games and went on to work on The Witcher 3: Wild Hunt.

McFarlane and Ang reportedly shared art direction duties. Early concept was noted for a lack of corners and angles, which Ang stated was a conscious artistic and technical choice to set it apart from other similar games. Pereira described the universe's visual identity as inspired by ancient texts and historical drawings. The original logo was based on the Ouroboros symbol, tying into the game's themes of death and rebirth, but it was dropped due to similarities with the logo of The Elder Scrolls Online. Salvatore created the 10,000 years of backstory and history for the Amalur setting with some friends in a Dungeons & Dragons group, and worked with McFarlane to ensure his art design matched the story. The backstory's large scope was insisted upon by Salvatore, who wanted a cohesive and compelling setting. The game's story, which had a planned four year arc, would have focused on different factions within Amalur banding together to fight a common enemy. A central theme was the social and psychological effects of the Well of Souls, an artefact which grants immortality to Amalur's population. Schilling had been eager to include centaurs as a playable race, but technical difficulties with their animations and programming meant they went unused.

Schilling was eager to develop a new large-scale title in the genre, although in 2009 he noted that it might have been easier to design in another genre. He encountered difficulties finding investor funding for the company and MMO, using much of his personal fortune together with smaller loans. In July 2010, 38 Studios completed an agreement with the state of Rhode Island in which they secured a $75 million financing package in exchange for moving to the region, the aim being to encourage the growth of a local gaming industry. The game was being built using Unreal Engine 3, while the BigWorld middleware tools were licensed for development. For voice chat and related communications both in-game and within the company, they licensed software from Vivox. An official title and platform were to be announced later.

Announcement and cancellation
The game was first mentioned alongside the studio's founding, and teased through concept art at the 2008 San Diego Comic-Con. The intention was to keep details on Project Copernicus sparse until the game was close to release. The MMO was intended to be the first Amalur release, but after 38 Studios acquired Big Huge Games in 2009 along with a promising game prototype, the release order was switched so the single-player title would release as an introduction to the world. This title, an action role-playing game titled Kingdoms of Amalur: Reckoning, would co-published in 2012 by 38 Studios and Electronic Arts. In later interviews, Salvatore described Reckoning as specifically showing the origins for the Well of Souls, which appeared in both projects, and being developed independently of Project Copernicus.

Schilling faulted the game's slow production and frequent missed deadlines, saying that ultimately the gameplay "wasn't fun". An anonymous employee later countered this, saying a small playtest group within the company were enjoying their time in-game, but participation was limited due to difficulty accessing private servers. By May 2012, the projected release for Project Copernicus was estimated as June 2013. McFarlane later described the project as being close to completion. According to developer statements and later official descriptions, the selectable character races were finished, zones were playable, and basic zone storylines were finished. 38 Studios COO William Thomas described the project as 75% complete.

Following the release of Reckoning in 2012, which sold below the studio's hopes, 38 Studios was struggling financially and by May of that year was unable to fulfill a loan repayment to Rhode Island. Publicity was exacerbated by hostile comments from RI's new governor Lincoln Chafee regarding the state loan, which were blamed for a lack of interest from outside publishers which might have secured more funds. Several approaches were made by Schilling to Sony Online Entertainment president John Smedley about selling the project, but Smedley turned it down as "[economically] too tough to make work for us". On May 24, 38 Studios declared bankruptcy, letting go of all employees without warning and causing development to halt; the company's assets were taken over by the Rhode Island government, including those related to Project Copernicus and the Amalur property.

Aftermath and reactions
The Amalur IP and associated properties including Project Copernicus were put up for auction by Rhode Island alongside the rest of 38 Studio's assets in December 2012. Despite early interest, Amalur properties were not sold during the auction. Subsequently, Jeff Easley was described as the studio's only remaining employee, tasked with keeping the technical aspects of Project Copernicus running until a buyer could be found. In September 2018, the Amalur rights and properties were acquired by THQ Nordic.

Despite having turned down Schilling's offer, Smedley lauded the design and art of Project Copernicus. Lars Buttler, CEO of Trion Worlds, blamed the project's failure and by extension the studio's collapse on an overambitious scope for a first-time developer. Michael Pachter, a financial analyst for Wedbush Securities, was skeptical about the Amalur IP finding funding given the market at the time. Speaking about the MMO in relation to 38 Studios and initial failure to sell the IP and its assets, Chafee called it "a lot of junk", which prompted a hostile reaction from Schilling on social media. Smedley, Buttler, and Pachterall noted the changing video game market at the time was not suitable for new MMORPGs, with Buttler and Pachter specifically highlighting the subscriber slump of Star Wars: The Old Republic after its initial launch.

Multiple staff recalled feeling shocked and demoralized leading up to and following the closure, as they had worked hard on Project Copernicus and the company had fostered a strong team spirit. Salvatore echoed these sentiments, noting that changing market conditions and running over budget had killed the project, but adding that he held not grudges. Speaking in 2013, McFarlane held out hope another company would resurrect the game. A trailer for Project Copernicus was published online on May 18, 2012 less than two weeks before its closure. This trailer was put together during the last few weeks of the company's life by staff eager to show what they had done, and was shown in the office to a standing ovation. Further leaked videos of Project Copernicus following 38 Studio's closure included pre-alpha footage of character creation and navigation, and several staff members mentioned details related to its setting and mechanics in interviews and online posts.

A 2012 feature by Gamasutra on defining events in gaming that year, mentioned Project Copernicus as "a reminder of just how expensive and risky a triple-A MMO is in our rapidly evolving climate." In a 2021 list of unreleased MMOs, Stephen Messner of PC Gamer noted that the project had potential to be a good entry into the genre despite little concrete gameplay information, but that despite not being officially cancelled, it was unlikely to see release. Brendan Sinclair, writing for GamesIndustry.biz, highlighted Project Copernicus and 38 Studios as a cautionary tale of over-ambition and an example of bad employer practices within the gaming industry.

References

Cancelled video games
Massively multiplayer online role-playing games
Unreal Engine games
Video games developed in the United States